This list of University of Oklahoma buildings catalogs the structures on the campus of the University of Oklahoma in Norman, Oklahoma. Buildings are categorized based on their current functions and locations.

Main campus

Academic facilities

Administrative facilities

Athletic facilities

Museums

Residential facilities

Other facilities

Research campus facilities

Planned facilities

Historic campus photographs

References 

University of Oklahoma campus
Oklahoma, University of
University of Oklahoma